Opening Night is a 1977 American psychological drama film written and directed by John Cassavetes, and starring Gena Rowlands, Ben Gazzara, Joan Blondell, Paul Stewart, Zohra Lampert, and Cassavetes. Its plot follows a stage actress who, after witnessing the accidental death of one of her fans, is haunted by a recurring apparition of the deceased woman, spurring a nervous breakdown while she prepares for the premiere of a Broadway play.

Though set in Connecticut and New York City, Opening Night was shot on location in Los Angeles and Pasadena, California, with the theatrical performance sequences taking place at the Pasadena Civic Auditorium.

Plot
Myrtle Gordon is a famous but troubled middle-aged actress performing out-of-town previews in New Haven, Connecticut of a new play called The Second Woman before its Broadway run. While leaving the theatre after a performance, Myrtle signs autographs and encounters an obsessive teenaged fan, Nancy, who runs after Myrtle into the street and is struck by a car. Myrtle is unsettled by the incident, and even goes to the girl's shiva, though her family greets her coolly.

Myrtle struggles to connect with the character she is playing in The Second Woman, finding her to have no motivation beyond her age. Over the course of numerous performances, Myrtle departs from the play's script in myriad ways, including changing her lines, throwing props around the set, breaking the fourth wall, and collapsing on stage. This frustrates others involved with the play. The writer, Sarah Goode, attempts to force Myrtle into facing her age. Myrtle admits to her that she has been seeing the apparition of Nancy—the teenager killed in the car accident—which Myrtle believes is a projection of her youth.

Myrtle's state of mind continues to deteriorate, and she begins to drink heavily. She imagines Nancy attacking her, and later she throws herself against the walls of Sarah's hotel room, breaking her sunglasses and slashing her face. The incident disturbs Sarah, who expresses her wish to have Myrtle replaced in the play, feeling she is psychologically unable to perform. After storming out of a rehearsal, Myrtle visits Sarah's spiritual medium for help and has another violent encounter with her vision of Nancy, this time fighting back and “killing” Nancy's ghost. Myrtle attempts to seduce Maurice Aarons—her leading man and a former lover—but he refuses.

Myrtle fails to show up on time for her call on opening night. When she finally arrives, Myrtle is so drunk that she can barely stand. With the audience growing restless, director Manny Victor demands the show go on. Myrtle struggles through the show's opening scenes, collapsing before her entrance and again on stage. As the show continues, Myrtle finds something of a rhythm. By the end, she and Maurice go off script and improvise the play's final act, to the producers’ chagrin and the audience's rapturous applause.

Cast

Analysis
Writing in a 2018 retrospective for Esquire, critic Dom Nero describes Opening Night as a horror film or art horror film, writing: "In the way that its title sequence magnifies the mundane cheers of an audience into a violently furious sound, it takes our reality and presents the concurrent darkness within like the truth-driven horror films such as Get Out. In the way that it drapes Gena Rowlands in long, black, specter-like capes and collars—and the primal world around her colored in bright, bloody reds—it turns a funhouse mirror onto the crushing, almost satanic rituals of film acting and movie star culture like in Mulholland Drive. In the way that its haunting and minimalistic score is reminiscent of a John Carpenter theme, it makes a psychological break as foreboding as a masked bogeyman haunting suburban teenagers."

Production

Though set in New Haven, Connecticut and New York City, Opening Night was shot on location in Los Angeles and Pasadena, California. The film's theater sequences were shot at the Pasadena Civic Auditorium.

Release
In common with earlier films, Cassavetes struggled to get Opening Night distributed in the United States. After a number of preview screenings, it opened on December 25, 1977, at the Fox Wilshire Theater, Los Angeles where it played to almost empty houses, and closed in February having never been commercially shown elsewhere. Screenings in New York City that March were similarly ignored. The film was only picked up by an American distributor in 1991, two years after Cassavetes' death.

In 1978, it was entered into the 28th Berlin International Film Festival, where Gena Rowlands won the Silver Bear for Best Actress.

The film was screened out of competition at the 1992 Cannes Film Festival.

Reception
Opening Night was critically panned in the US on its release. The review in Variety that appeared after a press screening concluded, "One must question whether more than a handful of moviegoers are interested in the effort, whether audiences have not already seen enough of Cassavetes' characters ... He's made these films before and not many seemed interested in them." When it opened in New York, the film was not reviewed at all in most newspapers and magazines.

The film was better received in Europe, with the Hollywood Foreign Press Association nominating Rowlands and Blondell for the Best Actress and Best Supporting Actress, respectively, at the 35th Golden Globe Awards.

Its reputation has improved since its initial release. It currently holds a 96% "fresh" rating on Rotten Tomatoes from 26 reviews; the consensus states: "Opening Night is as dense and difficult as one would expect from John Cassavetes, but even the director's detractors will be unable to deny the power of Gena Rowlands' performance."

Film critic Dan Schneider wrote, of the film's narrative structure:

Many critics have taken this film to be a portrait of an alcoholic ... But this is wrong, for alcohol isn't her problem – nor is her chain smoking. They are merely diversions from whatever thing is really compelling her to her own destruction, and much to Cassavetes' credit, as a storyteller, he never lets us find out exactly what's wrong with Myrtle, and despite her coming through in the end, there's no reason to expect that she has really resolved anything of consequence. This sort of end without resolution links Cassavetes directly with the more daring European directors of the recent past, who were comfortable in not revealing everything to an audience, and forcing their viewers to cogitate, even if it hurts.

In pop culture
The film has been referenced by several musicians. Back to the Beat, an EP from the band, Motion City Soundtrack, features a song titled "Opening Night", in reference to the film. The Hold Steady's 2008 album Stay Positive makes various allusions to the film; the closing song "Slapped Actress" is the most explicit. "Shut Up"—the first track on Savages' 2013 album Silence Yourself—opens with dialogue between Rowlands and Blondell sampled from the film. Róisín Murphy's music video for "Exploitation", from the album Hairless Toys, serves as an homage to the movie.

Jessica Pratt cited the film as an influence on her album Quiet Signs and titled the instrumental first track "Opening Night." Describing her reaction to the film after viewing it at a screening, she said, “Sometimes when you see a film, especially an emotional, anguishing film like that, it can just simmer in your subconscious for a while. It definitely did that for me.” 

Pedro Almodóvar repeats the film's accident scene in his film All About My Mother as the center of the dramatic conflict.

References

External links

 
 
 
Opening Night: The Play’s the Thing an essay by Dennis Lim at the Criterion Collection

1977 films
1977 drama films
1970s ghost films
1970s psychological drama films
American independent films
American psychological drama films
American psychological thriller films
1970s English-language films
Films directed by John Cassavetes
Films about actors
Films about alcoholism
Films set in Connecticut
Films set in Manhattan
Films shot in Los Angeles
Films about mental health
1970s American films